Metraco Zagłębie Lubin is a women's handball club from Lubin, Poland, that plays in the Superliga.

Achievements
 Superliga:
Winners: 2011, 2021, 2022
Silver Medalists: 1995, 2000, 2002, 2006, 2009, 2010, 2012, 2013, 2014, 2017, 2018, 2019, 2020
Bronze Medalists: 1996, 2001, 2007, 2008
 Puchar Polski:
Winners: 2009, 2011, 2013, 2017, 2019, 2020, 2021
Silver Medalists: 1998, 2006, 2010, 2014, 2015, 2022
 EHF Cup:
Semifinalists: 2001
 EHF Cup Winners' Cup:
Semifinalists: 2002

Team

Squad
Squad for the current 2022–23 season

Goalkeepers
1  Monika Wąż
 16  Barbara Zima
 99  Monika Maliczkiewicz

Wingers
LW
6  Kinga Grzyb
7  Wiktoria Kocinska
 40  Daria Michalak
RW
 4  Aneta Łabuda
 17  Adrianna Górna
Line players
 20  Joanna Drabik
 6  Natalia Pankowska
 92  Jovana Milojević

Back players
LB
 15  Jana Šustková
 73  Viktoria Belmas
 77  Patrycja Świerżewska
CB
 26  Emilia Galińska
 42  Karin Bujnohova
 47  Karolina Kochaniak-Sala 
 49  Patricia Matieli
RB
3  Kina Jakubowska

Transfers
Transfers for the 2023–24 season

 Joining

 Leaving

Technical staff
  Head Coach: Bożena Karkut

References

External links
 Official website

Polish handball clubs
Handball clubs established in 1982
Zagłębie Lubin
1982 establishments in Poland
Women's sports teams in Poland